General Pico Airport  is an airport serving General Pico, a town in the La Pampa Province of Argentina.

Runway length includes a  displaced threshold on Runway 34.

The General Pico VOR-DME and non-directional beacon (Idents: GPI) are located on the field.

See also

Transport in Argentina
List of airports in Argentina

References

External links
OpenStreetMap - General Pico
FallingRain - General Pico Airport

Airports in Argentina